The 1848 United States presidential election in New York took place on November 7, 1848, as part of the 1848 United States presidential election. Voters chose 36 representatives, or electors to the Electoral College, who voted for President and Vice President.

New York voted for the Whig candidate, Zachary Taylor, over Free Soil candidate Martin Van Buren and Democratic candidate Lewis Cass. Taylor won New York by a margin of 21.51% over Van Buren. As of 2020, Van Buren's performance remains the best ever by a third-party candidate in New York presidential election history. With 26.43% of the popular vote, New York was Van Buren's fourth strongest state after Vermont, Massachusetts and Wisconsin.

Van Buren's 26.4% of the popular vote was mostly taken from Cass' voters. If Van Buren had not been in the election and Cass had won New York, then Lewis Cass would have won the election.

Results

See also
 United States presidential elections in New York

References

New York
1848
1848 New York (state) elections